Pleisthenes, in Greek mythology,  was the son of Atreus and Aerope. According to Hesiod, Pleisthenes married Cleolla, daughter of Dias, and  became the father of Agamemnon, Menelaus, and Anaxibia. Aeschylus also followed this tradition when he called the Atreidai "the race of Pleisthenes" (τὸ Πλεισθένους γένος).

Mythology 
According to Hyginus, Pleisthenes was raised by Atreus's brother Thyestes, accompanied Thyestes into exile, and was sent by Thyestes to kill Atreus. Not realizing that he was the young man's father, Atreus killed Pleisthenes.

Agamemnon and Menelaus are commonly considered the sons of Atreus; hence they are often given the name Atreidai, or "the sons of Atreus". One explanation for this discrepancy is that, after the early death of Pleisthenes, Atreus raised his grandsons, the sons of Pleisthenes, as his own sons.

John Tzetzes reports that in the Hesiodic Catalogue of Women Pleisthenes was either a hermaphrodite or a transvestite.

Notes

References 

 Aeschylus, translated in two volumes. 2. Agamemnon by Herbert Weir Smyth, Ph.D. Cambridge, MA. Harvard University Press. 1926. Online version at the Perseus Digital Library. Greek text available from the same website.
 Gaius Julius Hyginus, Fabulae from The Myths of Hyginus translated and edited by Mary Grant. University of Kansas Publications in Humanistic Studies. Online version at the Topos Text Project.
 Hesiod, Catalogue of Women from Homeric Hymns, Epic Cycle, Homerica translated by Evelyn-White, H G. Loeb Classical Library Volume 57. London: William Heinemann, 1914. Online version at theio.com
Tzetzes, John, Allegories of the Iliad translated by Goldwyn, Adam J. and Kokkini, Dimitra. Dumbarton Oaks Medieval Library, Harvard University Press, 2015. 

Characters in Greek mythology